Pissy-Pôville is a commune in the Seine-Maritime department in the Normandy region in northern France. The 19th-century historian Théodore Bachelet (1820–1879) was born in this village.

Geography
The A151 autoroute passes through the commune's territory.

History
The commune was formed in 1822 through the merger of the towns of Pissy and Pôville.

Population

Places of interest
 The church of St. Martin, dating from the thirteenth century.
 A sixteenth century manorhouse with a dovecote.
 Traces of a Roman villa.

See also
Communes of the Seine-Maritime department

References

Communes of Seine-Maritime